Homeobox protein Mohawk, also known as iroquois homeobox protein-like 1, is a protein that in humans is encoded by the MKX (mohawk homeobox) gene. MKX is a member of an Iroquois (IRX) family-related class of 'three-amino acid loop extension' (TALE) atypical homeobox proteins characterized by 3 additional amino acids in the loop region between helix I and helix II of the homeodomain.

Function 
MKX is a transcription factor that regulates tendon differentiation during embryological development. Knocking out this gene in mouse embryos results in them developing hypoplastic tendons containing less type I collagen. MKX binds directly to the promoter of MyoD and represses its expression, negatively regulating muscle differentiation.

Expression of MKX is maintained in adult tendon tissues, decreasing as a result of ageing or osteoarthritis. Collagen fibres in tendons become more dense and thick following mechanical stimulation as a result of exercise, and MKX is essential in this mechanosensory process.

References

Further reading